Hasvik is a municipality in Troms og Finnmark county, Norway.  The administrative centre of the municipality is the village of Breivikbotn.  Other villages in the municipality include Breivik, Hasvik, and Sørvær.  The population of Hasvik has generally been in steady decline due to problems within the fishing industry.  Hasvik is an island municipality with no road connections to the rest of Norway. Hasvik Airport is served with regular connections to Tromsø and Hammerfest, and there is a two-hour ferry crossing to the village of Øksfjord on the mainland, providing access by car.

The  municipality is the 196th largest by area out of the 356 municipalities in Norway. Hasvik is the 335th most populous municipality in Norway with a population of 964.

General information

The municipality of Hasvik was established in 1858 when the northern part of Loppa Municipality was separated to form this new municipality.  The initial population was 506. The borders of the municipality have not changed since that time.

On 1 January 2020, the municipality became part of the newly formed Troms og Finnmark county. Previously, it had been part of the old Finnmark county.

Name
The Old Norse form of the name was probably Hásvík. The first element is then the genitive case of the local mountain name Hár (now Håen) and the last element is vík which means "cove" or "wick". The actual name of the mountain is compared in form with an old oarlock (Old Norse: hár).

Coat of arms
The coat of arms was granted on 13 July 1984. The official blazon is "Azure, a gull argent rising". This means the arms have a blue field (background) and the charge is a seagull that is just taking flight. The seagull has a tincture of argent which means it is commonly colored white, but if it is made out of metal, then silver is used. The blue color in the field and the seagull were chosen by the municipality as a symbol for the local fishing and fish processing industry which attracts many seagulls. The design of the arms was proposed by Martha Gamst from Breivikbotn, and it was refined and finalized by Arvid Sveen.

Churches
The Church of Norway has one parish (sokn) within the municipality of Hasvik. It is part of the Alta prosti (deanery) in the Diocese of Nord-Hålogaland.

History
In 1900, Hasvik was connected to the telegraph system of the rest of Norway.

In June 1944, a Catalina aircraft crashed into a mountain in Hasvik, killing the crew of 6; the crew consisted of Soviet airmen wearing American uniforms; the aircraft was flying from the U.S. to Murmansk, Russia via Iceland. (138 PBN-1s produced by Naval Aircraft Factory served with the Soviet Navy, after the NAF transferred ownership via Project ZEBRA). The remains of the crew members were moved out of Norway after World War II.

Stranded Soviet warship 

In the sea off the village of Sørvær, the decommissioned  Soviet cruiser Murmansk ran aground on Christmas Eve in 1994. Her towlines had snapped off the nearby North Cape while the vessel was on its way to India to be scrapped. She stayed in Sørvær for 18 years.

In 2012, the operation to removed the vessel started. A breakwater and dry dock was constructed around the vessel to access it from land and demolish it where it rested. The dock around the wreck was sealed in April. By mid-May the dock was almost empty of water and the demolishing of the cruiser began. The project was completed in 2013.

In 2021, a plaque was unveiled in the presence of minister of defence, representatives from embassies of USA and Russia, and  a Russian military attaché; 6  Soviet airmen who died in 1944, were honored.

Government
All municipalities in Norway, including Hasvik, are responsible for primary education (through 10th grade), outpatient health services, senior citizen services, unemployment and other social services, zoning, economic development, and municipal roads.  The municipality is governed by a municipal council of elected representatives, which in turn elect a mayor.  The municipality falls under the Hammerfest District Court and the Hålogaland Court of Appeal.

Municipal council
The municipal council  of Hasvik is made up of 15 representatives that are elected to four year terms. The party breakdown of the council is as follows:

Geography

The municipality of Hasvik is situated on the western side of Sørøya, Norway's fourth largest island (other than Svalbard). Most people in Hasvik are to be found in a string of settlements along the western coast: the three largest being Breivikbotn, Sørvær, and Hasvik.  The municipality also includes the very sparsely populated northern part of the island of Stjernøya, including the Sørfjorden area.  Stjernøya has no road or ferry connections.

Climate
Hasvik, situated on Sørøya island, has a subpolar oceanic climate (Cfc) with winter temperatures hovering around freezing, and cool short summers. The winters are very mild considering the latitude of more than 70 degrees North. The driest season is April to July, and the wettest season is October to January. The wettest month October get more than twice as much precipitation as the driest month May. The all-time high temperature  was recorded August 2018; the all-time low  recorded in December 2002. The weather station at the small airport close to the village has been operating since January 1984. Extremes available since 2002.

References

External links

Municipal fact sheet from Statistics Norway 
Article about life expectancy in Hasvik 8 August 2021. Nrk.no 
Weather information for Hasvik 

 
Populated places of Arctic Norway
1858 establishments in Norway